Murrumbidgee Shire was a local government area in the Riverina region of south western New South Wales, Australia. The Shire was located adjacent to the Murrumbidgee River and the Newell Highway.

The two main administrative centres for the Murrumbidgee Shire were Coleambally and Darlington Point.  It also contained the small town of Waddi.

Amalgamation
The Jerilderie Shire Council submitted an alternate proposal to the Minister for Local Government that the entire Jerilderie Shire be amalgamated with the Murrumbidgee Shire.

Murrumbidgee Shire was dissolved on 12 May 2016 with the area, along with Jerilderie Shire, incorporated into the new Murrumbidgee Council.

Council

Former composition and election method
At the time of dissolution, Murrumbidgee Shire Council was composed of six councillors elected proportionally in two separate wards, each electing three councillors. All councillors were elected for a fixed four-year term of office. The mayor was elected by the councillors at the first meeting of the council. The final election was held on 8 September 2012. In East Ward, there were only three candidates, being those below, nominated for election. There being no additional candidates, the election for East Ward was uncontested. An election was held in the North Ward.

References 

Local government areas of the Riverina
Former local government areas of New South Wales
2016 disestablishments in Australia